The Gamate, known as  (pinyin: chāojí xiǎozi, literally "Super Boy") in Taiwan and  (pinyin: chāojí shéntóng, literally "Super Child Prodigy") in China, is a handheld game console manufactured by Bit Corporation in the early 1990s, and released in Australia, some parts of Europe, Asia (Taiwan and China), Argentina, and the United States.

The only emulator that supports it is MESS, with games also playable on a MiSTer. Over 70 games, not all dumped, are known to have been produced for the system.

History
The Gamate appears to be the first of the many handheld consoles released in reaction to the success of Nintendo's Game Boy.  It was originally released by the Taiwanese game company Bit Corporation in conjunction with local distributors around the world, such as Alston Research in the USA, the joystick maker Cheetah Marketing in the UK, toy company GIG in Italy, video game importer Uranium in Switzerland, Greek Software in Greece, ITMC subsidiary Yeno in Germany, Famiclone manufacturer Electrolab in Argentina and PlayMix in Sweden.

Bit Corp. ceased operating in 1992 but UMC and its subsidiary Funtech continued to produce Gamate hardware and software.

Hardware
Unlike other Taiwanese or Hong Kong Game Boy competitors, such as the Watara Supervision, Hartung Game Master and the Mega Duck, the Gamate's internal hardware contains no epoxy covered chips and was assembled in a quality manner. The build quality is relatively akin to that of the Game Boy. The shell is made of thick plastic and with batteries installed, the unit feels very similar to the weight of a Game Boy.

Screen
The screen on the Gamate is very similar to the Game Boy. It is a greenish color, with manual contrast adjustment, and non-backlit. Backlit screens were not common in 1990. Moving objects appear blurry and faint - the quality known as "ghosting" - which can make game play very frustrating.

The Gamate seems, however, to have had two different types of LCD screen used throughout its lifespan. The easiest way to tell which type one has is by turning the Gamate on without a game in - the "bad" one displays vertical lines while the "good" one displays a slightly corrupted checkerboard pattern.

Sound
The Gamate internally uses an AY-3-8910 sound chip that can generate 3 channels of square waves and one for noise. The Gamate's  mono internal speaker is of poor quality, giving off sound that is quite distorted, particularly at low volumes. However, if a user plugs into the headphone jack, some of the sound channels are mapped to the headphone's left/right channels that forms stereo audio, and the output is of a relatively high quality.

Shell
The G1001 Gamate is dark grey in color and has a "x" D-pad and small speaker vents. The G1002 Gamate are dark grey in color and have a "+" D-pad design and large speaker vents. A variant in this design, with a white shell and red buttons also exists.

Serial numbers
All Gamates have a seven digit serial number near the card port on the rear of the console. The first two digits represent the year of manufacture, while the last five represent the unit's chronology. Therefore, a unit with the number "9001687", was the 1687th produced in 1990. The newest unit thus far discovered was produced in 1993.

Specifications
CPU UMC UA6588F (earlier revision); NCR 81489, 8 bits (BIT WS39323F) in a QFP-100 shell (later revision)
ROM 2 KB (UM6116M-2L CMOS static RAM, pin compatible with ROM/EPROM chips)
RAM 16 KB (2 × CXK5864M-15L chips) of static RAM
Case: Grey plastic
Keys D-pad, A, B, START and SELECT
Sound General Instrument AY-3-8910, output via either internal mono speaker or external stereo headphones
Media ROM card, very similar to HuCard (PC-Engine), My Card (Sega SG-1000) and Sega Card (Sega Master System) 19×2 pins
Input/Output
Cartridge Slot
Stereo headphones
Power
External link connector (for 2-player games)

Expansion
Gamate link cable
Ni-CD battery pack

Games
  
Games cartridges for the Gamate are slim plastic cards with exposed pins, similar to PC-Engine or Sega Master System cards. Within the large illustrations are the game title and, unlike most systems, a simple numerical designation (C1-001, C1-002, etc.), making organization reasonably simple for collectors. The exact number of games released remains unknown. Some articles regarding the Gamate state it has "about 35 games or so", but the true number may be closer to 70. One contributing factor to this ambiguity is that as Bit Corp. had passed into bankruptcy, games continued to be published by UMC, but very few left the Asian market.

Many titles are clones of popular games from the era (Tetris, Bomberman, Lode Runner, Battle City, etc.). Bit Corp. (and later UMC) is given sole credit within each game, but inconsistencies in game content and labeling make it far more likely that several developers were involved in designing individual games; two external developers are currently known, Gamtec and Hengmao Electronics. Some titles suffer from assorted bugs. A few titles seem to be original concepts, and a great many more remain mysterious due to their scarcity.

While in general the higher-numbered games were released later and in smaller quantities, there seems to be little correlation with this principle prior to the C1-040's, with random numbers inexplicably difficult to find.

Game list (incomplete)

References

External links
 
 Gamate @ Neofuji - game and hardware information, scans, game screenshots etc

Handheld game consoles
Fourth-generation video game consoles
Video game lists by platform